Heraklion (alternative spellings: Iraklio, Iraklion, Irakleio, Herakleion) is a Greek city name referring to Herakles and most notably used for Heraklion, the administrative capital and largest city of Crete and the fifth largest in Greece. 

Heraklion may also refer to:


Ancient
Herakleion (Pieria), in ancient Macedon, Greece
Heracleion, an ancient city near Alexandria, Egypt

Modern
Irakleio, Attica, a suburban city in the Athens urban area
Irakleio, Corinthia, a village in Corinthia
Irakleio, Thessaloniki, a village in Thessaloniki Prefecture

Ships
 1925-1993, a coaster, originally SS Manganese
 1949-1966, a roll on/roll off car ferry, originally SS Leicestershire.  Lost in a storm with about 220 deaths out of about 260 aboard; one of the greatest maritime disasters in Greek history.

See also 
 Heracleum (disambiguation)
 Heracles (disambiguation)
 Iraklis (disambiguation)